Britta Schall Caroc Holberg (25 July 1941 – 23 February 2022) was a Danish politician. A member of the Venstre party, she served as Minister of the Interior from 1982 to 1986, Minister for Agriculture from 1986 to 1987, and was a member of the Folketing from 1984 to 1988 and again from 2005 to 2011. She died on 23 February 2022, at the age of 80.

References

1941 births
2022 deaths
20th-century Danish women politicians
21st-century Danish women politicians
Agriculture ministers of Denmark
Danish Interior Ministers
Women members of the Folketing
Venstre (Denmark) politicians
Commanders of the Order of the Dannebrog
People from Næstved Municipality